Posłuchaj to do Ciebie is the second album by Polish punk rock band Kult.

Track listing

1987 Release
 "Na całym świecie źle się dzieje koledzy" (The world is going bad, my friends)"
 "Hej, czy nie wiecie" (Hey, Don't You Know)
 "Post" (The Fast)
 "Kult" (The Cult)
 "Totalna stabilizacja" (Total Stabilization)
 "Narodzeni na nowo" (Born Again)
 "Umarł mój wróg" (My Enemy Died)
 "Elektryczne nożyce" (Electric Scissors)
 "Spokojnie" (Calmly)
 "Rozmyślania wychowanka" (Contemplations of a Foster-Child)
 "(Gdziekolwiek idę) z tobą chcę iść" (Everywhere I Go, I Want to Go With You)

The first song is better known as "Wódka" (English: Vodka). It was renamed due to censorship office request.

1992 Release
 "Piosenka młodych wioślarzy" (The Song of Young Oarsmen)
 "Piloci" (Pilots)
 "Do Ani" (To Anna)
 "Polska" (Poland)
 "Babilon" (Babylon)
 "Taniec wielki" (The Great Dance)
 "Wódka" (Vodka)
 "Hej, czy nie wiecie" (Hey, Don't You Know)
 "Post" (The Fast)
 "Kult" (The Cult)
 "Totalna stabilizacja" (Total Stabilization)
 "Narodzeni na nowo" (Born Again)
 "Umarł mój wróg" (My Enemy Died)
 "Elektryczne nożyce" (Electric Scissors)
 "Spokojnie" (Calmly) 
 "Rozmyślania wychowanka" (Contemplations of a Foster-Child)
 "(Gdziekolwiek idę) z tobą chcę iść" ((Everywhere I Go,) I Want to Go With You)
 "Wódka II" (Vodka II)

Credits
All songs of 1987 release and songs 4–18 of 1992 release were recorded by:
 Kazik Staszewski – lead vocalist, alto saxophone, drum machine programming
 Janusz Grudziński – lead guitar, keyboards, cello
 Ireneusz Wereński – bass guitar
 Paweł Szanajca – saxophone
 Tadeusz Kisieliński – drumset
 Kostek Joriadis – trumpet, congas, keyboards
 Jacek Kufirski – drum machine programming
 Włodzimierz Kowalczyk – sound engineer
 Tadeusz Czechak – sound engineer

Songs 1–3 of 1992 release were recorded by:
 Kazik Staszewski – lead vocalist, saxophone
 Piotr Wieteska – bass guitar
 Janusz Grudziński – lead guitar
 Jacek Szymoniak – keyboards
 Tadeusz Kisieliński – drumset

References
 
 
 

1987 albums
Kult (band) albums